George Thomson McLean (1898 – 1970) was a Scottish professional footballer who played for Forfar Athletic, Bradford (Park Avenue) and Huddersfield Town.

Career
McLean began playing football in his native Scotland for Scottish Football Alliance side Forfar Athletic in 1920 before coming to England in 1921 to play for Bradford Park Avenue in Football League Division Two. He left Forfar just before the Loons joined the Scottish Football League. He was good enough to sign a contract just before his leaving to ensure the Angus side received £700 from his new club for his services.

Bradford were relegated in his first season but McLean stayed at Horton Park Avenue, becoming one of their legendary players, scoring over a century of league goals and guiding the club to the Division Three North title in 1928. McLean also played in the famous FA Cup upsets of Everton in 1923 and Derby County in 1930, scoring the last minute winner in the former. After a decade in Bradford, McLean was signed by First Division Huddersfield Town in 1930. He went home to Forfar and made his second debut in 1935, playing until the outbreak of World War II in 1939.

Personal life
He was the younger brother of footballer David McLean who was a noted goalscorer of the age. They were teammates at Bradford for one season (1921–22, David's last of three campaigns at the club and George's first of nine) and both closed out their careers at Forfar, but David (eight years older) had retired by the time George came 'home'.

He died in 1970.

References

1898 births
1970 deaths
English Football League players
Scottish Football League players
Scottish footballers
Association football inside forwards
Bradford (Park Avenue) A.F.C. players
Huddersfield Town A.F.C. players
Forfar Athletic F.C. players
People from Forfar
Footballers from Angus, Scotland